Lakdar Boussaha (born 18 July 1987) is a French-Algerian professional footballer who plays as a forward.

Club career
Born in Bourg St Maurice, France, Boussaha started his career in the junior ranks of US Annecy Le Vieux. At the start of the 2008–09 season, he joined the US Boulogne reserve team, scoring 15 league goals and adding 7 more in the cup. He was promoted to the first team at the start of the 2009–10 season, and after netting 11 goals in 5 games for the reserve team, he was given his Ligue 1 debut on 4 October 2009, in a league game against Lille OSC. Boussaha started the game and was replaced at the 54th minute.

At the end of the 2009–10 season, the club announced that his contract would not renewed.

On 20 May 2010, Boussaha went on trial with Algerian club JSM Béjaïa.

In August 2019, Boussaha joined Swiss Promotion League club Étoile Carouge FC.

References

1987 births
Sportspeople from Albertville
Footballers from Auvergne-Rhône-Alpes
French sportspeople of Algerian descent
Living people
Association football forwards
Algerian footballers
French footballers
US Boulogne players
Racing Besançon players
JSM Béjaïa players
Football Bourg-en-Bresse Péronnas 01 players
Grenoble Foot 38 players
Étoile Carouge FC players
Championnat National players
Championnat National 2 players
Ligue 1 players
Algerian Ligue Professionnelle 1 players
Swiss Promotion League players
French expatriate footballers
Expatriate footballers in Switzerland
French expatriate sportspeople in Switzerland